The Cricău is a right tributary of the river Galda in Romania. It discharges into the Galda in Oiejdea.

References

Rivers of Romania
Rivers of Alba County